Ted McMeekin (born ) is politician in Ontario, Canada. He is the Ward 15 Councillor, for the City of Hamilton. He was a Liberal member of the Legislative Assembly of Ontario from 2000 to 2018 who represented the ridings of Ancaster—Dundas—Flamborough—Westdale and Ancaster—Dundas—Flamborough—Aldershot. He served as a cabinet minister in the governments of Dalton McGuinty and Kathleen Wynne.

Background
McMeekin completed his bachelor's degree in social work at McMaster University and his master's degree in social work from Wilfrid Laurier University. He has served as executive director of the Burlington Social Planning Council, and was for a time the chair of part-time studies at Mohawk College (where he also taught courses). He has also worked on social justice issues for the United Church of Canada, and was the owner and operator of a small bookstore for eight years.

Municipal politics
Before entering provincial politics, McMeekin was a member of the Hamilton, Ontario City Council representing Ward 7 (Hamilton Mountain). After retiring from Council, he moved to Flamborough, Ontario, a rural community which lies on the outskirts of Hamilton, and later served a term of six years as mayor. McMeekin was also for a number of years Flamborough's representative on the Hamilton-Wentworth regional council, which the provincial government of Mike Harris eliminated in 2000 by amalgamating the city and outlying regions into a single political entity. McMeekin was one of the most vocal opponents of this change, noting that it would result in a loss of autonomy for Flamborough. On October 24, 2022 Ted returned to municipal politics, after winning a five person race to win a seat on Hamilton City Council in Ward 15.

Provincial politics
McMeekin's plans to jump from municipal to provincial politics had been rumoured for years, and it came as no surprise when he won the Liberal nomination for a by-election to be held in ADFA on September 7, 2000 (called following the resignation of Member of Provincial Parliament (MPP) Toni Skarica, another vocal opponent of the amalgamation scheme). Although the seat had gone overwhelmingly for the Progressive Conservatives the previous year, McMeekin defeated PC candidate Priscilla de Villiers by over 9,000 votes. The Conservatives had spent $211,989 on his competitor, nearly $80,000 in excess of McMeekin's $132,143. Local opposition to amalgamation was generally cited as the reason for this shift.

In the provincial election of 2003, McMeekin defeated Tory candidate Mark Mullins by a somewhat reduced margin. He served as parliamentary assistant to John Gerretsen in his capacity as the minister responsible for seniors from October 23, 2003, to September 27, 2004. On September 27, 2004, he was appointed assistant to Jim Watson, the Ministry of Consumer and Business Services.

In the provincial election of 2007, McMeekin defeated Progressive Conservative candidate Chris Corrigan. On October 30, 2007, McMeekin was named a cabinet minister, responsible for Government and Consumer Services. He was re-elected in 2011 and appointed Minister of Agriculture, Food and Rural Affairs.

In 2013, McMeekin supported Kathleen Wynne in her bid to become Liberal leader. After Wynne won, she named McMeekin to her first cabinet as Minister of Community and Social Services.

McMeekin was re-elected in 2014. Shortly after the election, Wynne appointed McMeekin as Minister of Municipal Affairs and Housing. He resigned from his post in June 2016 to help create gender parity in the cabinet. McMeekin was defeated in the 2018 election, where he placed third.

Cabinet positions

Electoral record

References

Notes

Citations

External links 

1948 births
21st-century Canadian politicians
Hamilton, Ontario city councillors
Living people
Members of the Executive Council of Ontario
Members of the United Church of Canada
Ontario Liberal Party MPPs
Wilfrid Laurier University alumni